Drew Smith is a Scottish Labour politician. He was Member of the Scottish Parliament (MSP) for the Glasgow region from 2011 to 2016, serving as Scottish Labour's frontbench spokesperson on social justice, the constitution and equalities and as Chair of the Trades Union Group of Labour MSPs.

Political career
He was first elected in 2011 and is a former Chair of Scottish Young Labour (2005–06) and former member of the Scottish TUC General Council (2007–10).

Drew Smith was Chair of the Young Workers Committee of the Scottish TUC in 2008–2009, and was awarded the Jimmy Waugh Memorial Prize for Services to Young Workers in 2011.  On three occasions when elected Drew Smith refused to cross picket lines to attend debates at Holyrood. On 20 March 2013 he spoke at a rally of public sector workers led by the Public and Commercial Services Union and the Scottish TUC in Glasgow's St Enoch Square instead of attending a parliamentary debate on the dispute and advocated a boycott of Labour MSPs from attending Parliament.

In 2013, Smith declared his support for a "soft opt-out" system of organ donation in Scotland, akin to that endorsed by Welsh Labour. He said such a scheme "will save lives" while ensuring that "the wishes of individuals are paramount".

He was an outspoken supporter and campaigner for equal marriage rights for gay and lesbian couples. However, he was criticised for his support for Unite Union's tactics during the 2013 Grangemouth Refinery industrial dispute.

He became Scottish Labour’s Shadow Cabinet Secretary for the Constitution in  2012 until the end of 2014. He announced his intention in 2015 to leave the Scottish Parliament at the 2016 Scottish General Election.

After retiring as an MSP, Smith worked for the GMB trade union. In December 2018, Scottish Labour announced that Smith would be appointed as an acting General Secretary of the party, to serve until the 2021 Scottish Parliament election.

See also 
 Scottish Labour Party

References

External links 
 
 Glasgow Region election result 2011, BBC
 

Year of birth missing (living people)
Living people
Politicians from Glasgow
Alumni of the University of Aberdeen
Alumni of the University of Glasgow
Alumni of the Open University
Labour MSPs
Members of the Scottish Parliament 2011–2016